AEG) was a German producer of electrical equipment founded in Berlin as the Deutsche Edison-Gesellschaft für angewandte Elektricität in 1883 by Emil Rathenau. During the Second World War, AEG worked with the Nazi Party and benefited from forced labour from concentration camps. After World War II, its headquarters moved to Frankfurt am Main.

In 1967, AEG joined with its subsidiary Telefunken AG, creating Allgemeine Elektricitäts-Gesellschaft AEG-Telefunken. In 1985, Daimler-Benz purchased the AEG-Telefunken Aktiengesellschaft (which was renamed to AEG Aktiengesellschaft) and wholly integrated the company in 1996 into Daimler-Benz AG (1998: DaimlerChrysler). The remains of AEG became part of Adtranz (later Bombardier Transportation) and Deutsche Aerospace (1998: DASA, today part of Airbus SE).

After acquiring the AEG household subsidiary AEG Hausgeräte GmbH in 1994, Electrolux obtained the rights to the AEG brand name in 2005, which it now uses on some of its products. The AEG name is also licensed to various brand partners under the Electrolux Global Brand Licensing program.

History

Summary

In 1883, Emil Rathenau founded Deutsche Edison-Gesellschaft für angewandte Elektricität in Berlin. In 1888 it was renamed Allgemeine Elektricitäts-Gesellschaft. Initially producing electrical equipment (such as light bulbs, motors and generators), the company soon became involved in AC electric transmission systems. In 1907, Peter Behrens was appointed as artistic consultant to AEG. This led to the creation of the company's initial corporate identity, with products and advertising sharing common design features.

The company expanded in the first half of the 20th century, and it is credited with a number of firsts and inventions in electrical engineering. During the same period, it entered the automobile and airplane markets. Electrical equipment for railways was produced during this time, beginning a long history of supplying the German railways with electrical equipment. According to the 1930 Encyclopedia Britannica: "Prior to 1923 it was the largest electrical manufacturing concern in Germany and one of the most important industrial undertakings in the world."

During the Second World War, AEG joined with other large companies such as IG Farben, Thyssen and Krupp in their support of the Nazis. The company benefited from the use of large numbers of forced labourers as well as concentration camp prisoners, under inhuman conditions of work.

After WWII, the company lost its businesses in the eastern part of Germany. After a merger in 1967, the company was renamed Allgemeine Elektricitäts-Gesellschaft AEG-Telefunken (from 1979 on only AEG-Telefunken). The company experienced financial difficulties during the 1970s, resulting in the sale of some assets. In 1983, the consumer electronics division Telefunken Fernseh und Rundfunk GmbH was sold. In 1985, the company re-took the name AEG and the remainder of the company was acquired by Daimler-Benz; the parts that remained were primarily related to electric power distribution and electric motor technology. Under Daimler-Benz ownership, the former AEG companies eventually became part of the newly named Adtranz in 1995, and the AEG name was no longer used. Electrolux, which had already acquired the household subsidiary AEG Hausgeräte GmbH in 1994, now own the rights to use and license the AEG brand.

Foundation to 1940

The company originated in 1882, when Emil Rathenau acquired licences to use some of Thomas Edison's lamp patents in Germany.  The Deutsche Edison Gesellschaft ("German Edison Company") was founded in 1883 with the financial backing of banks and private individuals, with Emil Rathenau as company director.

In 1884, Munich-born  engineer Oskar von Miller (who later founded Deutsches Museum) joined the executive board. The same year, the company entered negotiations with the Berlin Magistrat (the municipal body) to supply a large area from a central supply, which resulted in the formation of the Städtischen Elektrizitätswerke (A.G.StEW) ("City electricity works company (Berlin)") on 8 May 1884.

The original factory was located near Stettiner Bahnhof. In 1887 the company acquired land in the Berlin-Gesundbrunnen area on which the Weddingsche Maschinenfabrik (founded by Wilhelm Wedding) was previously located. In the same year, in addition to a restructuring and expansion of the production range, the AEG name was adopted.

In 1887 Mikhail Dolivo-Dobrowolsky joined the company as chief engineer, later becoming vice-director. His work on polyphase electric power led him to become the world's leading engineer in three-phase electric power systems at the end of the 1880s.

This success marked one of beginnings of the general use of alternating current for electrification in Germany, and showed that distance transmission of electric power could be economically useful. In the same year the Stadtbahn Halle/Saale (City railway Halle–Saale) opened, the first electric tram system (of notable size) in Germany

Tropp Paul began his work for the AEG 1889/90 until 1893, and Franz Schwechten designed the facades of the Acker- und Hussitenstraße in 1894–95.

In 1894 the site of the former Berlin Viehmarktgasse (cattle market alley) was purchased. This had a railroad siding connecting to the Berlin rail network, but there was no rail connection between the two plants.  In 1895 an underground railway link between the two plots was built in a tunnel 270 meters long. The tunnel was built by Siemens & Halske (S & H) (later to become Siemens) under the direction of C. Schwebel and Wilhelm Lauter who were also connected in the building of what is now the Spree tunnel Stralau used by the U-Bahn.

By 1889 AEG were known as specialists in the construction of industrial portable drilling machines, some of these were driven by flexible shafts from electric motors.  AEG also developed a toothed belt drive to reduce motor speed down to that required by machine tools.

In 1903 the competing radio companies AEG and Siemens & Halske merged, forming a joint subsidiary named Telefunken.

In 1907 architect Peter Behrens became an artistic adviser. Responsible for the design of all products, advertising and architecture, he has since become considered as the world's first corporate designer. Behren's philosophy was to create a building which is solid, strong and simple in its structure. It is perfect for doing its job of producing large, heavy machinery. The dimensions of the building were chosen to allow turbines to be transported above other machinery.

In the 1920s AEG became a global supplier of electrical know-how and equipment.  In 1923, for example, it provided most of the essential materials and a team of engineers to oversee the electrification of British-ruled Palestine.  British firms, at the time, could not compete with the prices of AEG 

The activity of the company soon extended to all areas of electrical power engineering, including electric lighting, electric power, electric railways, electro-chemical plants, as well as the construction of steam turbines, automobiles, cables and cable materials. In the first decades, the company had many factories in and around Berlin:
Maschinenfabrik Brunnenstrasse (steam turbines, dynamos, electric motors)
Apparatewerk Ackerstrasse (carbon-filament and metal thread light bulbs, Nernst lamps, switches, fuses, resistors, electrical measuring equipment, dynamos, electric motors)
Kabelwerk Oberspree (KWO, cables, copper and metal works, rubber fabrication, insulator fabrication)
Transformatorenwerk Oberspree (TRO, transformers)
Glühlampenfabrik Moabit (1907–1912, carbon-filament and metal thread light bulbs, Nernst lamps, Vacuum tubes) — later became part of Osram, from 1939 on Telefunken
Turbinenfabrik (1909, steam turbines) — famous as an example of industrial architecture
Apparate-Werke Treptow  (AT - 1926, arc lamps, switches, fuses, controls, starters, electrical measuring equipment)

A number of other notable events involving AEG occurred in this period:
1900: Invention of the hairdryer.
1901: The Neue Automobil Gesellschaft ("New Automotive Company") became part of AEG through the takeover of Allgemeine Automobil-Gesellschaft
This world speed record for rail vehicles was held until 1931.
1904: Merger of AEG with the Union-Elektricitäts-Gesellschaft (UEG) (literal: Union-electricity Company)
1910: Factory Hennigsdorf. Entry into the aircraft building market.
1929: AEG produced its first compressor-driven refrigerators and temperature controlled irons.
1933: AEG joined other large manufacturing companies to support Adolf Hitler
1935: Presentation of the world's first tape device Magnetophon K1 based on work by Eduard Schüller at the Berlin Radio Show
1941: AEG bought Siemens & Halske shares in Telefunken and the company became a subsidiary.

On 20 June 1915, founder Emil Rathenau died at age 77.

The Nazi era and World War II

AEG donated 60,000 Reichsmarks to the Nazi party after the Secret Meeting of 20 February 1933 at which the twin goals of complete power and national rearmament were explained by Hitler. They joined with other large companies such as IG Farben, Thyssen and Krupp in their support of the Nazis, especially in promoting re-armament of the Wehrmacht, Luftwaffe, and Kriegsmarine. During the war itself, they were to use large numbers of forced labourers as well as concentration camp prisoners, under inhuman conditions of work.

AEG worked extensively with the Nazi party in Poland. AEG was forced to relinquish Kabelwerk Krakow, a cable manufacturing plant, to the Nazi party. Kabelwerk Krakow was located in Krakow-Plaszow and used forced Jewish labor manufacturing cables from 1942 to 1944. In 1943, AEG began to relocate goods and evacuate workers. Goods were relocated to various places, including Berlin and Sudetenland. When installing electric and lighting systems for the Waffen-SS training grounds in Dębica, AEG used forced labor from Jews placed in the Pustkow labor camp located in Southeastern Poland.

During World War II, an AEG factory near Riga used female slave labour. AEG were also contracted for the production of electrical equipment at Auschwitz concentration camp.

AEG used slave labour from Camp No. 36 at the new sub-camp of Auschwitz III and also known as Monowitz, called "Arbeitslager Blechhammer". Most of them would die in 1945 during the death marches and finally in Buchenwald.

AEG was a major supplier of grips found on World War II P38 pistols manufactured by Walther Arms, Mauser, as well as on the early wartime Spreewerk P38s.

In an effort to express regret for their use of Jewish slave labor in World War II, AEG joined with Rheinmetall, Siemens, Krupp, and I G Farben to pay DEM75 million in reparations to the Jewish Claims Conference.

1945 to 1970
In 1945, after the Second World War, the production in the factories in the western sectors of Berlin - what today is the building of the headquarters of DW (TV)Deutsche Welle - and Nuremberg, Stuttgart and Mulheim an der Ruhr resumed and further new works were erected, among others an Electric meter plant in Hameln.

The steam and electric locomotive plant in Hennigsdorf (Fabriken Hennigsdorf) became a Volkseigener Betrieb (VEB) (people owned enterprise) as the Lokomotivbau Elektrotechnische Werke (LEW) ("electric locomotive works"). The cable plant (Draht-, Kabel- und Metallwerk Oberspree) and apparatus factory (Apparatefabrik Treptow) and other facilities also lay in East Germany and became Sowjetische Aktiengesellschaft (SAG) (Soviet joint stock companies). Over 90% of assets in Berlin lay in the Russian occupied zone and were lost.

The headquarters for the non-expropriated parts of the company was moved first to Hamburg and then finally to Frankfurt am Main, the headquarters in Berlin having been destroyed.

1948: The AEG factories Kassel (FK) were founded on the site of the former MWK Motorenbau Werk Kassel at Lilienthalstrasse 150 in Kassel/Hesse/Germany. The first factory part was the high voltage switchgear factory (HSF), later the refrigerator factory (KSF), the ticketprinter factory (FDF), the isolating material factory (IF) as well as the worldwide accepted high voltage institute (HI)were founded. In the early sixties more than 5000 people worked for AEG in Kassel. Today, the site Lilienthalstrasse still produces high voltage switchgear.
1950: The new corporate headquarters is at the Friedensbrücke (Peace Bridge) in Frankfurt / Main. The number of employees in the Group rose from 20,900 in September 1948 to 55,400 persons in September 1957. In the same year the turnover exceeded one billion DM for the first time, however the high level of investment in the rebuilding of the company (1948 to 1956 over 500 million DM) placed a considerable strain on the balance sheet.
1958: The slogan  "Aus Erfahrung Gut" (benefit from experience) is introduced to explain the company name and acronym, leading to unflattering parodies such as "Auspacken, Einschalten, Geht nicht" (unpack, switch on, does not work) or "Alles Ein Gammel" (everything is 'gammy').
1962: The Group has 127,000 employees and generates annual sales of 3.1 billion DM. In Springe a new factory is opened in February 1962 a new factory for the production of fluid control units with 200 employees.
1962: Walter Bruch at Telefunken in Hannover develops PAL color television.
1966: The largest industrial space in Europe is created (175 m long, 45 m wide and 26 m high) for the construction using cranes of engines and generators with weights up to 400 tonnes. Robert F. Kennedy attends the opening.
1 January 1967: Merger with Telefunken creates AEG-Telefunken, headquartered in Frankfurt am Main.

1970s onwards

In 1970, AEG-Telefunken had 178,000 employees worldwide, and was the 12th largest electrical company in the world. The company was burdened by, among other things, unsuccessful projects such as an automated baggage conveyor system at Frankfurt Airport and nuclear powerplant construction. In particular, the nuclear power plant at Würgassen, the commissioning of which was delayed by several years due to technical problems cost AEG hundreds of millions of DM. As a result, the company paid its last dividend in 1972.

The entertainment arm (Telefunken Fernseh und Rundfunk GmbH) headquartered in Hanover was sold. This was followed by the computer mainframe business (TR 4, TR 10) (a partnership under the name Telefunken Computer GmbH with the company Nixdorf) was sold to Siemens. The process computer (TR 84, TR 86, AEG 60–10, AEG 80–20, AEG 80–60) continued as Geschäftsbereich Automatisierungstechnik (after 1980 as ATM Computer GmbH).

In 1975 the former Telefunken Headquarter at Berlin-Charlottenburg, Ernst-Reuter-Platz 7 was sold. The building had been previously rented to the Technical University of Berlin

In 1976, to circumvent the requirement of equal participation of employees in the supervisory board, Dr. Walter Cipa (Dipl.-Geol.) (AEG boss from 1976 to 1980) created four further companies as wholly owned joint stock companies in addition to the two household appliance companies. (The numbers in parentheses refer to percentage of turnover in 1980)
AEG-Telefunken Anlagentechnik AG (37%)
AEG-Telefunken Serienprodukte AG (16%)
AEG-Telefunken Kommunikationstechnik AG (6%)
Olympia-Werke AG (business office technology, 7%)
AEG-Hausgeräte GmbH (22%)
Telefunken Fernseh und Rundfunk GmbH (12%)

In 1979 Allgemeine Elektricitäts-Gesellschaft AEG-Telefunken was renamed AEG-Telefunken AG by dropping the supplement "Allgemeine Elektricitäts-Gesellschaft", used since 1887. In February 1980, Heinz Dürr became board Chairman (until 1990).

In August 1982 a restructuring plan, backed with federal guarantees of 600 million DM and new bank loans of 275 million DM, fell apart at the first disagreement between the banks. A banking consortium provided an administrative loan of DM 1.1 billion to the AEG Group until June 1983; 400 million of which only to be available on a guarantee by the federal government. Not only was AEG-Telefunken AG affected, but also its subsidiaries Küppersbusch AG in Gelsenkirchen, Hermann Zanker Maschinenfabrik GmbH & Co. KG in Tübingen and Carl Neff GmbH in Bretten. 
The Alno-Möbelwerke GmbH & Co. KG in Pfullendorf was taken over by the minority shareholders, and separated from the group.

The suppliers to AEG were affected and some filed for bankruptcy—including Becher & Co. Möbelfabriken KG in Bühlertann—with lack of continuity of company policy a factor. The site at Brunnenstraße in the former Berlin district of Wedding was also sold, as were the firms AEG-Fabrik Essen and Bauknecht.
1983/84: the consumer electronics division (Telefunken television and broadcasting GmbH) was sold to the French group Thomson-Brandt.
1985: AEG was taken over by Daimler-Benz AG. Daimler-Benz executive Edzard Reuter (from 1987 Daimler CEO), decides two companies should form an "integrated technology group" with beneficial synergy.
1988: On its 60th anniversary the AEG-Forschungsinstituts (AEG Research Institute) creates the Carl-Ramsauer Prize for scientific/technical dissertations.
1990: AEG Westinghouse Transportation Systems GmbH is formed in association with Westinghouse Transportation Systems Inc.
1992: Merger (or re-uniting) of the railway business with the Lokomotivbau Elektrotechnische Werke (LEW) in Hennigsdorf, resulting in the formation of AEG Schienenfahrzeuge GmbH (AEG locomotives)
1992: The Swedish company Atlas Copco acquires AEG Power Tools Ltd; divested in 2004 to Techtronic Industries.
1994: sale of the Automation division to Schneider Electric and of AEG Hausgeräte AG to Electrolux.
1995: AEG Schienenfahrzeuge GmbH becomes part of ABB Daimler-Benz Transportation (Adtranz) (subsequently becoming part of Bombardier Transportation in 2001).
1996: The Annual General Meeting of Daimler-Benz AG chaired by Juergen Schrempp decides upon the dissolution of the lossmaking group.
1996: GEC ALSTHOM acquires AEG Power T&D business
September 1996: The company is deleted from the commercial register.

Products

Locomotives and railway technology

AEG played an important role in the history of the German railways; the company was involved on the development and manufacture of the electrical parts of almost all German electric locomotive series and contributed to the introduction of electrical power in German railways.

Additionally many steam locomotives were made in AEG factories. In 1931 the company acquired Borsig and transferred the locomotive production to the AEG-Borsig works (Borsig Lokomotiv-Werke GmbH) from the Borsig plant in Tegel. In 1948 the plant became VEB Lokomotivbau Elektrotechnische Werke. In addition to numerous electric locomotives produced for the DR steam locomotive production continued until 1954.

When the Federal Republic of Germany began implementing AC propulsion systems AEG found itself in competition with Brown, Boveri & Cie.  The prototype DB Class E320 was built with Krupp as dual voltage (15 kV and 25 kV AC) test machine, the technology ultimately leading to locomotives such as DB Class 120 and ICE 1.

Only after German reunification and the adoption of the LEW plant in Hennigsdorf did AEG's name return to whole locomotive manufacturing, but only for a short time. "AEG locomotives GmbH " became part of ABB Daimler-Benz Transportation (later ADtranz) and currently the technology developed in the past, in part, now enables Bombardier Transportation to build the very successful TRAXX series of locomotives.

AEG also built the Hellenic Railways TRAINOSE Class 520DMUs between 1989/1990/1991 and 1994/1995/1996.

Aircraft

AEG manufactured a range of aircraft from 1912 to 1918. The first aircraft in 1912 was of wooden construction and modeled after the biplane of the Wright brothers. From 1912, the construction of airplanes proceeded in mixed wood and steel tube construction with fabric covering.

One of the planes designed and built was Riesenflugzeug ("giant aircraft") AEG R.I. This aircraft was powered by four  Mercedes D.IVa engines linked to a combination leather cone and dog clutch. The first flight tests were satisfactory, but on 3 September 1918, the R.I broke up in the air killing its seven crewmen.

The most successful in terms of production figures of all the AEG aircraft designs was that of the G.IV Grossflugzeuge ("large aircraft") heavy tactical bomber, of which one still survives of the 320 built, as the sole surviving World War One German multi-engine bomber.

During the Second World War AEG produced machines for reconnaissance purposes, including a helicopter platform driven by an AC motor. This was a tethered craft that could not fly freely; the power supply was carried by three cables from the ground. The machine reached an altitude of 300 m.

Cars

AEG bought Kühlstein in 1902, founding the division Neue Automobil Gesellschaft (New Automobile Company), to make cars. AEG withdrew from car production in 1908.

Models produced include:
AAG (1900 automobile)
NAG Typ A
NAG Typ B
NAG Typ B2

Film projectors
AEG also produced for a long period a series of film projectors:
 Stillstandsmaschine 1919 Projektor 35 mm
 Theatermaschine 1920 Projektor 35 mm
 Triumphator I–III 1924–1935 Projektor 35 mm ACR 0710
 Successor (Lehrmeister) 1925–1935 Projektor 35 mm
 Kofferkino 1927 encased Projektor 35 mm
 Lehrmeister 1929 Projektor 35 mm ACR 0709 (Leitz)
 Mechau Modell 4 1929 – 1934 Projektor 35 mm
 Euro K 1938–42 Projektor 35 mm
 Euro M 1936 Projektor 35 mm
 Euro G 1938 Projektor 35 mm, Interlock-Version (G-MB)
 Euro M2 1939–1944 Projektor 35 mm

Leadership

The AEG brand today
As a result of the breakup and dissolution of the original company, Electrolux acquired the brand rights in 2005 and the name is also licensed to various companies: Currently the brand is being actively promoted by Electrolux; it includes many of the same products that it formerly manufactured, such as power solutions energy devices, telecommunication devices (phones and mobile phones), automation, car accessories, home appliances, power tools, projectors, printing equipment and supplies, water treatment devices, and personal care devices under the AEG brand.

AEG Hausgeräte - became part of Electrolux, produces white goods such as washing machines, dishwashers, ovens, fridges etc.
ITM Technology AG produces consumer electronics and telecommunication (mobile phone, home phone etc.) equipment under the AEG name.
 Binatone manufactures mobile accessories, mobile phones, landline phones and two way radios under the AEG brand.
AEG Elektrowerkzeuge (AEG Power Tools), licensed to Techtronic Industries (TTI) since 2009, produces hand power tools.
AEG Haustechnik (licensed to Stiebel Eltron) produces home heating and climate control (humidifiers, airconditioners) products
AEG Industrial engineering produces electrical power equipment, including generators up to 55MW, control gear and switchgear, electrical motors, transformers etc. as well as high power inverters and DC supplies for industrial use.
AEG SVS Schweiss-Technik: manufacturer resistance welding machines and equipment
AEG Gesellschaft fur moderne Informationssysteme mbH (AEG-MIS): Develops custom LCDs for information systems
AEG ID: produces RFID tags and readers
AEG Power Solutions (formerly Saft Power systems or AEG Power Supply Systems): produces uninterruptable/backup/stable power supply systems for electric supply sensitive equipment (e.g. computers)
AEG Professional Printing Equipment and Supplies: Produces wide format printers, inks, and media products for printing, as well as photoconductor drums and toners for printing applications (e.g. laser printer/photocopier) 
 AViTEQ Vibrationstechnik GmbH
 Lloyd Dynamowerke GmbH & Co KG
 Lafert Group

References
Notes

Bibliography
Gerd Flaig,  Firmengeschichte der AEG ("History of AEG") Compiled by former AEG employee from AEG Telefunken archives gerdflaig.de

Further reading
 Buddensieg, Tilman. Industriekkultur: Peter Behrens and the AEG, 1907-1914 (1984)
 Buse, Dieter K. and Doerr, Juergen C., eds. Modern Germany: An Encyclopedia of History, People, and Culture, 1871-1990  (2 vol. Garland, 1998) pp 10–11. 
 Flaningam, M. L. "International Co-operation and Control in the Electrical Industry: The General Electric Company and Germany, 1919-1944." American Journal of Economics and Sociology 5.1 (1945): 7-25.
 Erdmann Thiele (ed.): Telefunken nach 100 Jahren — Das Erbe einer deutschen Weltmarke. Nicolaische Verlagsbuchhandlung Berlin, 2003.
 Aus der Geschichte der AEG: Vor 25 Jahren: Bau der ersten AEG-Flugzeuge. In: AEG-Mitteilungen. Jahrgang 1937, Heft 10 (Oktober), pp. 359–362.
 Peter Obst: Die Industrie am Humboldthain (Maschinenfabrik), AEG 1896–1984. Innovations-Zentrum Berlin Management (IZBM) GmbH.
 S. Müller, K. Wittig, S. Hoffmann (2006): Empirische Befunde zum Konsumentenboykott. Der Fall AEG/Electrolux. Dresdner Beiträge zur Betriebswirtschaftslehre Nr. 116/06. Marketing-Verein, TU Dresden - Empirische Befunde zum Konsume
 Hans-Heinrich von Fersen: Autos in Deutschland 1920–1939.
 50 Jahre AEG, als Manuskript gedruckt. Allgemeine Elektricitäts-Gesellschaft Abt. Presse, Berlin 1956.
 Gert Hautsch: Das Imperium AEG-Telefunken, ein multinationaler Konzern. Frankfurt/Main 1979.
 Felix Pinner: Emil Rathenau und das elektrische Zeitalter. Akademische Verlagsgesellschaft mbH, Leipzig 1918.
 Harri Czepuck: Ein Symbol zerbricht, zur Geschichte und Politik der AEG. Dietz Verlag, Berlin 1983.
 Tilmann Buddensieg: Peter Behrens und die AEG, Neue Dokumente zur Baugeschichte der Fabriken am Humboldthain. In: Schloss Charlottenburg Berlin-Preußen. Deutscher Kunstverlag, München 1971.
 Peter Strunk: Die AEG. Aufstieg und Niedergang einer Industrielegende. Nicolai, Berlin 2000.
 Jahresringe Verband für Vorruhestand und aktives Alter, Land Brandenburg e. V. (ed.): Zeitzeugnisse 1945–1990. Part I (1999) and II (2000).

External links

AEG-Electrolux — company website aeg.de (in German)
AEG Design case History of AEG logos goodlogo.com
AEG — Allgemeine Elektricitäts Gesellschaft AEG — general electric company — brief history of the company, with images of old products and share certificates (German language)
Aufstieg und Fall der AEG: Nur die drei Buchstaben haben überlebt Rise and Fall of AEG: only three letters remain. Article about history of AEG. heise.de
Seidel/Dame: 1920 – Versorgungsbauten für Groß-Berlin (AEG-Bauten); eine ausführliche und bebilderte Darstellung zu AEG in Berlin Architectural history of AEG buildings. Authors : Cira López Miró, Gladys Griffault, Eric Sommerlatte, Christoph Bickenbach laufwerk-b.de
 AEG - A brand makes history (12 min documentation on YouTube)
 

 
Electronics companies of Germany
Defunct manufacturing companies of Germany
Defunct aircraft manufacturers of Germany
Defunct mobile phone manufacturers
Defunct motor vehicle manufacturers of Germany
Electrical engineering companies of Germany
Electrical equipment manufacturers
Electrolux brands
Home appliance manufacturers
Marine engine manufacturers
Power tool manufacturers
Tool manufacturing companies of Germany
Manufacturing companies based in Frankfurt
Manufacturing companies established in 1883
Manufacturing companies disestablished in 1996
German brands
Companies involved in the Holocaust
German companies established in 1883
German companies disestablished in 1996
Companies formerly in the MDAX
1996 mergers and acquisitions